Saint-Maurice-en-Cotentin (literally Saint-Maurice in Cotentin) is a commune in the Manche department in Normandy in north-western France.

See also
Communes of the Manche department

References

Saintmauriceencotentin